The fixture between CR Belouizdad and USM Alger is a local derby in Algiers, Algeria and a fierce rivalry. The derby does not have a common name. From the first meetings in the 1960s, a sport rivalry settled between the two clubs. It slowly fades in the next two decades before being revived in the late 1990s and early twenty-first century.

History

The beginning (1962–1990)
The first meeting between CR Belouizdad and USM Alger took place on September 30, 1962 in a friendly Match. The CR Belouizdad, newly created on July 15 of the same year, organized a pre-season tournament at Stade municipal. USM Alger, Algeria's future champion, dominates CR Belouizdad by five goals to one (5–1). On 22 December 1963 they met for the first time in an official match in Critériums d'Honneur and ended with a single goal for USM Alger by Krimo Rebih, The 1960s saw little control in favor of The Reds and Blacks However, in terms of titles, Les Belcourtois was the best five titles for one, In the 1968–69 Algerian Cup they met for the first time in the final and ended the match with the victory of CR Belouizdad 5–3, including hat-trick of Hacène Lalmas the first and only in the history of the confrontations between the two clubs. In the seventies the control of the CR Belouizdad on June 28, 1970 met for the second time in a row in the final cup and ended with a heavy result 4–1 for Les Belcourtois, This period witnessed a difference in level between the two teams CR Belouizdad continued to achieve titles, and USM Alger did not achieve anything and its results were not good and most were playing on the fall where they played two seasons in the Second Division in this period.

In 1977 a sports reform was carried out as intended by the Ministry of Youth and Sports, in order to give the elite clubs a good financial base allowing them to structure themselves professionally (in ASP Which means Association Sportive de Performances). The aim was therefore that they should have full management autonomy with the creation of their own training center. CR Belcourt sponsored by the national Mechanical company which induces the change of its name which becomes Chabab Mécanique de Belcourt (CMB). as for USM Alger sponsors the club and change the name to Union sportive kahraba d'Alger (USK Alger), meaning electricity who had inherited the Société nationale de l'électricité et du gaz company (Sonelgaz)., on 11 May 1978 they met for the third time in the cup final and ended like the first two finalists for CR Belouizdad on penalties 3–0. In the 1980s, saw the end of professionalism in 1987  faced with a major financial and economic crisis, the Algerian government in place in 1989 decides to abandon the 1977 reform. Most clubs thus reconnect with their original names, on June 23, 1988 They met for the fourth time in the Final of the Algerian Cup and this time USM Alger managed to win a 6–5 on penalty shootout. In 1991, the district of Belcourt will be baptized in the name of the revolutionary Mohamed Belouizdad, this change will not influence the acronym of the club which remains the same so the club is named Chabab Riadhi Belouizdad.

Return after five seasons (1995–2010)
After 5 seasons in the Second Division, the excitement between the two teams returned, and their level was close between 1995 and 2002 Where CR Belouizdad and USM Alger achieved 5 titles each one, on 12 June 2003. They met in the Algerian Cup final for the fifth time, USM Alger with a Golden goal through Moncef Ouichaoui achieved the title for the sixth time. In the same season they won the league title for the fourth time, this is the first double of its history (league and cup), under the leadership of coach Azzedine Aït Djoudi On February 24, 2003, in the derby meeting against CR Belouizdad and in the last minutes while Hichem Mezaïr was heading to fetch the ball, the ball holder attacked him to respond in kind, so the match stopped and the stands turned into an arena of violence between the managers and supporters of the two clubs and despite that, the match was completed with difficulty. After that, the level of CR Belouizdad dropped dramatically and the matches between the two sides became mostly for the benefit of USM Alger and between 2002 and 2010, CR Belouizdad won only two time from 16 matches. In this period USM Alger achieved 4 titles, while CR Belouizdad did not achieve any title. Also between 25 August 2008 and 13 September 2014 saw a record of 13 unbeaten matches for USM Alger. Also in the same period CR Belouizdad were unable to score in eight consecutive games.

Second professional era (since 2010)

It was decided by the Ligue de Football Professionnel and the Algerian Football Federation to professionalize the Algerian football championship, starting from the 2010–11 season Thus all the Algerian football clubs which until then enjoyed the status of semi-professional club, will acquire the professional appointment this season. the president of the Algerian Football Federation, Mohamed Raouraoua, has been speaking since his inauguration as the federation's president in Professionalism, USM Alger become the first professional club in Algeria businessman Ali Haddad became the majority share owner after investing 700 million Algeria dinars to buy an 83% ownership in the club. On October 27, 2010, Haddad replaced Saïd Allik as president of the club. On the other side CR Belouizdad did not find a company to invest until 2018 where bought Madar Holding the majority of shares. The company's officials then appointed the former President of USM Alger Allik as a general manager. On April 3, 2019 CR Belouizdad achieved his first win at Omar Hamadi Stadium against USM Alger since 1982. Allik received great criticism from the supporters of USM Alger, the club, which was its president for 16 years and demanded him to resign from the presidency of the amateur club but he refused. With the outbreak of protests in Algeria and the impact of USM Alger after the imprisonment of the club’s owner Ali Haddad, the amateur club of USM Alger headed by Saïd Allik, began to intervene to pull the rug out from ETRHB Haddad company, something that the supporters who demanded him to resign from CR Belouizdad did not like in order to interfere in the club’s affairs and with the request of the Minister of Youth and Sports not to Combine two positions, Saïd Allik returned to his resignation from the SSPA CR Belouizdad in a recent statement. Allik indicated that he did not understand the latest changes that have been made to the organization chart of the Algerian club in recent months. 

On March 15, 2020, the Ligue de Football Professionnel (LFP) decided to halt the season due to the COVID-19 pandemic in Algeria. On July 29, 2020, the LFP declared that season is over and CR Belouizdad to be the champion for the first time in 19 years and the seventh in its history. due to the COVID-19, the Algerian Super Cup has become threatened with cancellation On October 4, The Federal Bureau decided that the final play before the start of the 2020–21 season on November 21, 2020. In the first match between the two teams in the Super Cup, CR Belouizdad won the title for the second time in its history. After losing the final USM Alger decided to dismiss François Ciccolini from his post because he did not rise to the podium to receive the medal, which was considered an insult to an official body Where was the Prime Minister Abdelaziz Djerad present. On March 2, 2020, after it was expected that the USM Alger general assembly of shareholders will be on March 12, 2020, especially after the imprisonment of the former club president, Rabouh Haddad. The meeting witnessed the attendance of ETRHB Haddad representative and the absence of the amateur club president Saïd Allik, after two and a half hours, it was announced that Groupe SERPORT had bought the shares of ETRHB Haddad which amounted to 94.34%.

All-time head-to-head results

All-Time Top Scorers

Hat-tricks
A hat-trick is achieved when the same player scores three or more goals in one match. Listed in chronological order.

All-Time Top appearances
Bold Still playing competitive football in Algeria
since 1999–2000 season.
Statistics correct as of game on 7 December 2022

Honours

League matches

Algerian Cup results

League Cup results

Super Cup results

Shared player history

Players who have played for both clubs

  Mustapha Kouici (CR Belcourt 1968–80, USK Alger 1980–82)
  Amar Ammour (USM Alger 2002–09, CR Belouizdad 2011–14)
  Hamza Aït Ouamar (CR Belouizdad 2005–08 & 2008–09 & 2011–12, USM Alger 2009–11)
  Billel Benaldjia (USM Alger 2009–10, CR Belouizdad 2010–14)
  Mohamed Amine Aoudia (CR Belouizdad 2005–08, USM Alger 2015–16)
  Mehdi Benaldjia (USM Alger 200914–, CR Belouizdad 2012–14)
  Abdelkader Laïfaoui (CR Belouizdad 2005–07, USM Alger 2011–15)
  Nassim Bouchema (USM Alger 2011–16, CR Belouizdad 2016–17)
  Mustapha Kouici (CR Belouizdad 1968–80, USM Alger 1980–82)
  Sofiane Harkat (USM Alger 2009–10, CR Belouizdad 2011 & 2012–14)
  Mohamed Amine Hamia (CR Belouizdad 2017–18, USM Alger 2018–19)
  Farès Hamiti (USM Alger 2011–12, CR Belouizdad 2012–13)
  Djamel Menad (CR Belouizdad 1977–81, USM Alger 1996–97)
  Salim Hanifi (USM Alger 2013, CR Belouizdad 2013–14)
  Lamouri Djediat (USM Alger 2011–14, CR Belouizdad 2014–15)
  Hichem Mezaïr (USM Alger 2000–04, CR Belouizdad 2004–05)
  Soumaila Sidibe (USM Alger 2017–18, CR Belouizdad 2018–19)
  Alain Nebie (CR Belouizdad 2008–09, USM Alger 2009–10)
  Bouazza Feham (USM Alger 2011–15, CR Belouizdad 2015–17)
  Faouzi Bourenane (USM Alger 2016–17, CR Belouizdad 2018)
  Mohamed Benkablia (USM Alger 2016–17, CR Belouizdad 2018)
  Amir Sayoud (USM Alger 2016–18, CR Belouizdad 2019–21)
  Khaled Bousseliou (CR Belouizdad 2018–22, USM Alger 2022–present)
  Alexis Guendouz (USM Alger 2021–22, CR Belouizdad 2022–present)

Coaches who managed both clubs

  Miguel Ángel Gamondi (CR Belouizdad 2010–11, USM Alger 2012–13)
  Azzedine Aït Djoudi (USM Alger 2002–03, CR Belouizdad 2006)
  Djamel Menad (USM Alger 2005, CR Belouizdad 2011–12)
  Abdelkader Amrani (USM Alger 2007, CR Belouizdad 2018–present)
  Ali Benfadah (CR Belouizdad 1973–74, USM Alger 1980–82)
  Mustapha Heddane (CR Belouizdad ??–??, USM Alger 1997 & 2000)
  Mourad Abdelouahab (CR Belouizdad ??–??, USM Alger 2003–04)

Algerian Ligue Professionnelle 1 results

The tables list the place each team took in each of the seasons.

Notes

References

CR Belouizdad
USM Alger
Football rivalries in Algeria